Disturbance and its variants may refer to:

Math and science 
 Disturbance (archaeology), any change to an archaeological site due to events after the site was laid down
 Disturbance (ecology), a temporary change in average environmental conditions that causes a pronounced change in an ecosystem
 Disturbance (geology), linear zone of faults and folds
 Disturbance (statistics), the deviation of the observed value from the (unobservable) true function value
 Serious emotional disturbance, a mental illness
 Sudden ionospheric disturbance, an abnormally high plasma density in the D region of the ionosphere caused by a solar flare

Arts and media

Film
 Disturbance (2014 film), a section, and former title, of the film Tales of the Supernatural
 Disturbance (1942 film), an Italian drama film
 Domestic Disturbance, a 2001 American psychological thriller film

Music 
 Disturbance (Concord Dawn album), 2001
 Disturbance (Test Dept. album), 2019
 "Disturbance" (BoA song) , a 2013 digital single by South Korean singer BoA
 "Disturbance," a song by Eyehategod from the album Take as Needed for Pain
 "Disturbance", a song by God Is an Astronaut from the album All Is Violent, All Is Bright
 "Disturbance," a song by The Legendary Pink Dots from the 1991 album The Maria Dimension
 "Disturbance (Interlude)", a song by Tech N9ne from the 2001 album Absolute Power
 "Disturbance," a 1992 song by Scorpio Rising
 "Disturbance," a song by Oneiroid Psychosis from the 2001 album Dreams (With Pollutions When Virile)
 "The Disturbance", a 1967 song by The Move, B-side to debut 45, and released as a bonus track on the 1998 re-issue of The Move

Other uses 
 Disturbance theory, a political postulation
 Disturbing the peace
 Energy field disturbance, an alternative medicine diagnosis

See also
 Anomaly (disambiguation)
 Disruption (disambiguation)
 Turbulence (disambiguation)